This is the end of a list of students of music, organized by teacher.

T

Marcel Tabuteau

Nicola Tacchinardi

Paul Taffanel

Steven Takasugi 

 Chikako Morishita

Toru Takemitsu

Tan Xiaolin

Sergei Taneyev

Daniel Tarquínio

Francisco Tárrega

Giuseppe Tartini

Wilhelm Taubert

Dorothy Taubman

Antoine Taudou

Carl Tausig

John Tavener

Franklin Taylor

Alexander Tchaikovsky

Pyotr Ilyich Tchaikovsky

Ivan Tcherepnin

Nikolai Tcherepnin

Serge Tcherepnin

Ignaz Amadeus Tedesco

Robert Teichmüller

Georg Philipp Telemann

Rafael Tello

Emil Telmányi

Wayan Tembres

Giusto Fernando Tenducci

James Tenney

Michael Tenzer

Lionel Tertis

Sigismond Thalberg

Hilda Thegerström

Johann Theile

Willi Thern

Jacques Thibaud

Ambroise Thomas

István Thomán

Diane Thome

Randall Thompson

César Thomson

Virgil Thomson

Ludwig Thuille

Jukka Tiensuu

Heinz Tiessen

Edgar Tinel

Maria Tipo

Michael Tippett

Yakov Tkatch

Ernst Toch

Eduard Toldrà

Václav Tomášek

Tomášek (1774–1850, also 'Tomaschek'), autodidact

István Tomka

Giuseppe Torelli

 (probably)

Montserrat Torrent

Laurits Christian Tørsleff

Arturo Toscanini

Firmin Touche

Charles Tournemire

Donald Tovey

Tommaso Traetta

Gilles Tremblay

Lennie Tristano

<

Martin Rev

Giacomo Tritto

František Tůma

Józef Turczyński

Joaquín Turina

Daniel Gottlob Türk

Robert Turner

Burnet Tuthill

Hans Tutschku 

 Ann Cleare

"Blue" Gene Tyranny

U

Marco Uccellini

Delphine Ugalde

Vincenzo Ugolini

Chinary Ung

Heinrich Urban

Erich Urbanner

Gennaro Ursino

Anton Urspruch

Vladimir Ussachevsky

Galina Ustvolskaya

V

Fartein Valen

Giovanni Valentini

Giovanni Valesi

Francesco Antonio Vallotti

Gilius van Bergeijk

David Van Vactor

Edgard Varèse

Sergei Vasilenko

Ralph Vaughan Williams

Aurelio de la Vega

Isabelle Vengerova

John Verrall

Pauline Viardot

Paul Vidal

Carles Vidiella

Carlo Vidusso

Louis Vierne

Henri Vieuxtemps

Heitor Villa-Lobos

 Cacilda Borges Barbosa

Alexander Villoing

Ricardo Viñes

.

Francesco dalla Viola

Giovanni Battista Viotti

János Viski

Tomaso Antonio Vitali

Jāzeps Vītols

Loreto Vittori

Antonio Vivaldi

Pancho Vladigerov

Wladimir Vogel

Georg Joseph Vogler

Robert Volkmann

Georg Jacob Vollweiler

Han de Vries

W

Bernard Wagenaar

Diderik Wagenaar

Johan Wagenaar

Georg Christoph Wagenseil

Thomas Attwood Walmisley

William Wallace

Bruno Walter

Johann Gottfried Walther

Raymond Warren

Samuel Webbe

Bedřich Diviš Weber

Carl Maria von Weber

Anton Webern

Georg Caspar Wecker

Adolf Weidig

Jacob Weinberg

Leó Weiner

Christian Ehregott Weinlig

 (his nephew)

Christian Theodor Weinlig

John Weinzweig

Hugo Weisgall

Hans Weisse

Carl Friedrich Weitzmann

Dan Welcher

Egon Wellesz

Richard Wernick

Peter Westergaard

Frederik Thorkildsen Wexschall

José White Lafitte

Arthur Whiting

Charles-Marie Widor

Friedrich Wieck

Henryk Wieniawski

Wilhelm Friedrich Wieprecht

August Wilhelmj

Adrian Willaert

Healey Willan

 Cecil Gray

Alberto Williams

Ernest Williams

Richard Edward Wilson

Godfrey Winham

Alexander Winkler

I Nyoman Windha

Emanuel Wirth

Peter Wishart

Leopold Carl Wolff

Ermanno Wolf-Ferrari

Leonard Wolfson

Stefan Wolpe

Charles Wood

Henry Wood

James Wood

Joseph Wölfl

Paul Wranitzky

Richard Wüerst

Franz Wüllner

Johann Georg Wunderlich

Charles Wuorinen

Robert Wykes

Yehudi Wyner

X

Iannis Xenakis

Y

Kosaku Yamada

Abram Yampolsky

Akio Yashiro

Anna Yesipova

Michèl Yost

La Monte Young

Eugène Ysaÿe

Maria Yudina

Isang Yun

Z

Jan Zach

Friedrich Wilhelm Zachow

Alfred Zamara

Antonio Zamara

Nikolai Zaremba

Gioseffo Zarlino

, the father of the astronomer

Ruth Zechlin

Jan Dismas Zelenka

Władysław Żeleński

Ferdinand Zellbell

Carl Friedrich Zelter

Alexander Zemlinsky

Bernhard Ziehn

Efrem Zimbalist

Bernd Alois Zimmermann

Pierre-Joseph-Guillaume Zimmerman

Niccolò Antonio Zingarelli

Nikolai Zverev

Bernard Zweers

References
Citations

Sources

 
 
 Gann, Kyle (1997). American Music in the Twentieth Century. Schirmer. .
 Green, Janet M. & Thrall, Josephine (1908). The American history and encyclopedia of music. I. Squire.
 Greene, David Mason (1985). Greene's Biographical Encyclopedia of Composers. Reproducing Piano Roll Fnd.. .
 Griffiths, Paul (2011). Modern Music and After. Oxford University Press. .
 Highfill, Philip H. (1991). A Biographical Dictionary of Actors, Actresses, Musicians, Dancers, Managers, and Other Stage Personnel in London, 1660–1800: S. Siddons to Thrnne. SIU Press. .
 Hinkle-Turner, Elizabeth (2006). Women Composers and Music Technology in the United States: Crossing the Line. Ashgate Publishing. .
 Hinson, Maurice (2001). Music for More than One Piano: An Annotated Guide. Indiana University Press. .
 James (2014)
 Jones, Barrie; ed. (2014). The Hutchinson Concise Dictionary of Music. Routledge. .
 Mason, Daniel Gregory (1917). The Art of Music: A Comprehensive Library of Information for Music Lovers and Musicians. The National Society of Music. . ( Related books via Google).
 McGraw, Cameron (2001). Piano Duet Repertoire: Music Originally Written for One Piano, Four Hands. Indian University. .
 
 
 Sadie, Julie Anne & Samuel, Rhian; eds. (1994). The Norton/Grove Dictionary of Women Composers. W. W. Norton & Company. .
 Saxe Wyndham, Henry & L'Epine, Geoffrey; eds. (1915). Who's who in Music: A Biographical Record of Contemporary Musicians. I. Pitman & Sons.
 Wier, Albert Ernest (1938). The Macmillan encyclopedia of music and musicians. Macmillan.

Students by teacher